Soulmates is a play by Australian playwright David Williamson, published by Currency Press and set in the world of publishing.

Among the people satires are a critic, which was seen as a reflection of Williamson's battles with the critics over a long period of time.

Williamson later said he was "surprised that no one picked up Soulmates" for a film. "It worked very well with audiences on stage and is a classic revenge story."

Plot
Set in Melbourne and New York, this is a tale of revenge as the best-selling expatriate author Katie Best engineers a scheme to bring her most craven critic Danny O'Loughlin undone.

First Production
Soulmates was first produced by Sydney Theatre Company, at the Drama Theatre, Sydney Opera House, on 13 April 2002 with the following cast:
 HEATHER: Jacki Weaver
 DANNY: William Zappa
 KATIE: Amanda Muggleton
 GORDON: Barry Quin
 FIONA: Deborah Kennedy
 GREG: Jonathan Biggins
 MAX: Sean Taylor
 ATTENDANT: Ben Fransham
Director, Gale Edwards

Set Designer, Brian Thomson

Lighting Designer, John Rayment

Sound Design, Paul Charlier

Assistant Director, Annabel Scholes

References

Plays by David Williamson
2002 plays